Gymnastics competitions at the 2016 Pekan Olahraga Nasional were held between 20 September and 27 September at GOR Arcamanik, Bandung, West Java, Indonesia. A total of 136 athletes from 22 provinces competed in 24 events.

Qualification 
Qualification for 24 competition classes were contested at the Gymnastics National Championships 2015 which were held from 28 October to 5 November 2015 at Arcamanik Gymnasium Center, Bandung, West Java. A total of 136 athletes from 22 provinces competed in 24 events.

Medalists

Aerobics

Artistic gymnastics

Men's

Women's

Rhythmic gymnastics

Medal table

References

2016 Pekan Olahraga Nasional
2016 in gymnastics